Hoti may refer to:

 Hoti (region), a region of Malësia in northern Albania and southern Montenegro
 Hoti (tribe), an Albanian tribe
 Hoti (surname), an Albanian surname derived from the Hoti tribe in northern Albania
 Hoti, Mardan, an area in the Mardan District of Khyber Pakhtunkhwa, Pakistan
 Hoti, Plav, a village in Montenegro
 Hoti language, an extinct language of Indonesia
 Hodï (also spelt Hoti), an indigenous group living in the Venezuelan Amazon, and their language

People
Haider Khan Hoti
Azam Khan Hoti
Muhammad Khan Hoti
Akbar Khan Hoti
Abdul Ghafoor Hoti